Onmanorama is the online English news portal of Malayala Manorama group, which publishes the Malayala Manorama newspaper read by over 20 million Malayalis across the world, Vanitha, the largest circulated women's magazine in India, The Week (Indian magazine), an English weekly, and several other periodicals and children's books.

Onmanorama is headquartered at Kottayam in India's southern most state of Kerala.

The news portal mainly covers developments in Kerala and the southern states of India. Its coverage ranges from daily breaking news to long-form and researched pieces in various fields like sports, entertainment, movies, lifestyle, food and travel.

Onmanorama is known for its hyperlocal coverage of Kerala. Other than its network of reporters, the portal uses the network of Malayala Manorama, Manorama News, and ManoramaOnline, the online version of the newspaper, for its stories.

History 
Onmanorama was established in 1998 as English Manoramaonline and was re-branded as Onmanorama in 2016.

Notable people 

 Mammen Mathew   Chief Editor, Malayala Manorama
 Jayant Mammen Mathew  Executive Editor, Malayala Manorama,
 Mariam Mammen Mathew  CEO, Manorama Online & Onmanorama

Awards 
 In 2016, World Association of Newspapers and News Publishers (WAN-IFRA) named Onmanorama as one of the top three news websites in South Asia. 

 Onmanorama's News Documentary  Greener Pastures: 3 Unique Farmers, 1 Story ’  won several national and international awards.

References

External links 
 

Indian news websites
Asian news websites